Ahmed Hamdy Mohamed Sameh is the Samuel D. Conte Professor of Computer Science at Purdue University. He is known for his contributions to parallel algorithms in numerical linear algebra.

Biography 
Sameh received his BSc in civil engineering from the University of Alexandria, Egypt in 1961, MS in civil engineering from Georgia Institute of Technology in 1964 and PhD in civil engineering from the University of Illinois at Urbana–Champaign in 1968 under the supervision of Alfredo Hua-Sing Ang.

A conference on "High Performance Scientific Computing: Architectures, Algorithms, and Applications" was organized on October 11–12, 2010 at the Purdue University in honor of Sameh on the occasion of his 70th birthday.

Research 
Sameh and Eric Polizzi developed the SPIKE algorithm, a hybrid parallel solver for banded linear systems.

Awards and honors 
 Fulbright fellow, 1963–1964
 Fellow of SIAM, IEEE, AAAS and ACM
 William Norris Chair in Large Scale Computing, 1991–1992, 1993–1996
 IEEE's Harry H. Goode Memorial Award, 1999, for seminal and influential work in parallel numerical algorithms
 IEEE Computer Society Golden Core 1996 Charter Member

References 

Year of birth missing (living people)
Living people
Numerical analysts
Egyptian computer scientists
American computer scientists
Grainger College of Engineering alumni
Purdue University faculty
Fellows of the Association for Computing Machinery
Fellow Members of the IEEE
Fellows of the Society for Industrial and Applied Mathematics